The West Darfur gubernatorial election took place on 11–15 April 2010, alongside the wider Sudanese general election, to elect the Governor of West Darfur.

The race was won by the National Congress candidate; Jaafar Abdel Hakam. Hakam took over from Abu El Gasim El Haj; a member of the SLM/A faction of Minni Minnawi, who had taken over the Governorship in March 2007 as part of the terms of the 2006 Darfur Peace Agreement. Haj chose not to contest the election.

Results

References

Gubernatorial elections in Sudan